Pennsylvania Route 56 (PA 56) is a  state highway located in west central Pennsylvania. Its western terminus is at the eastern end of the C.L. Schmitt Bridge in New Kensington. Its eastern terminus is on U.S. Route 30 (US 30) west of Bedford.

Route description

PA 56 starts at the intersection of Industrial Boulevard and 9th Street in New Kensington, Westmoreland County; this is also the eastern end of the C.L. Schmitt Bridge, across the Allegheny River from the PA 28 freeway. In New Kensington, PA 56 first heads south along Industrial Boulevard before turning east onto 7th Street where it first encounters a short city-maintained section of road before transitioning back to state maintenance. In the east part of New Kensington, it has a concurrency with PA 366 before entering the city of Lower Burrell. Also in Westmoreland County, it has concurrencies with PA 356 and PA 66 Alternate. After crossing the Kiskiminetas River, PA 56 merges with PA 66 for a short distance in Armstrong County. It then travels east and eventually merges with PA 156, crossing into Indiana County. At this point, it merges with US 422 and heads toward Indiana. In Indiana, US 422 and PA 56 become a short freeway. At the U.S. 119 exit, PA 56 merges with US 119, heading south. 

PA 56 ends its concurrency with US 119 in Homer City and continues east on a two-lane road. Approaching Armagh, it crosses US 22 at an interchange. The route then enters Westmoreland County again briefly, passing through its extreme northeastern corner. It is at this point, that PA 56 crosses through Seward. A short time after passing through Seward, it crosses into Cambria County. Continuing east, it travels along the southern side of the Conemaugh River through the Conemaugh Gap.  It then emerges into the city of Johnstown. 

PA 56 travels through the heart of the West End section of Johnstown on two-lane city streets. It then merges with PA 403 on Broad Street, a four-lane road containing many traffic signals. At the final signal, it breaks away from PA 403 and becomes a freeway entitled Johnstown Expressway. PA 56 enters the four-lane expressway and meets US 219. It eventually exits US 219 at Scalp Avenue, the original interchange, and continues east toward Windber. The route enters Somerset County at Windber. Once past Windber, PA 56 returns to two lanes. The descent down the eastern slope contains a dangerous hairpin curve that has been the site of many accidents over the years. It then crosses Interstate 99 (I-99) US 220 at an interchange near Cessna. After a short distance, PA 56 crosses over I-99 and US 220, then later passes under the Pennsylvania Turnpike (I-76 and I-70). The route ends at a T intersection with US 30 in Wolfsburg, west of Bedford.

Major intersections

PA 56 Truck

Current

Pennsylvania Route 56 Truck is a  truck route in the Pittsburgh industrial suburb of New Kensington, Pennsylvania. The route's western terminus also marks the end of its parent, as each formulate a different way of travel for those who have crossed the C.L. Schmitt Bridge. While Route 56 makes several turns as it passes through the stop light-filled center of the community, the truck route runs as the four-lane Industrial Boulevard along the Allegheny River, before turning back north as it is multiplexed with Pennsylvania Route 366.

Former

Pennsylvania Route 56 Truck was an east-west truck route bypassing a weight-restricted bridge over Little Brush Creek in Brush Valley, on which trucks over 29 tons and combination loads over 40 tons were prohibited. It was formed and established in 2013 and it used to follow US 119 and US 22.  As of October 2015, the "Truck PA 56" signs were removed off of US 22 and US 119.

See also

References

External links

Pennsylvania Highways: PA 56

056
Limited-access roads in Pennsylvania
Transportation in Westmoreland County, Pennsylvania
Transportation in Armstrong County, Pennsylvania
Transportation in Indiana County, Pennsylvania
Transportation in Cambria County, Pennsylvania
Transportation in Somerset County, Pennsylvania
Transportation in Bedford County, Pennsylvania
Transportation in Johnstown, Pennsylvania